Pablo Rodriguez is a Swiss non-fiction author, consciousness theorist, entrepreneur and consultant, and a former composer and record producer. He is the developer of C-Pattern Theory and the writer of the homonymous book, in which a possible explanation for subjective experience, consciousness and the mind-body problem is put forward. He is also the CEO and founder of Exmosol, a neuroscience-based startup in the field of Experience Modifying Solutions. Furthermore, Rodriguez advises on Customer Excellence with a focus on e-commerce, applying his proprietary “360° Customer Excellence” method and framework.

Career 
Rodriguez initially worked in Zurich as an entrepreneur in the creative industries and as a composer / songwriter and producer. Under his participation, numerous works were created for international artists and corporate clients, some with over 20 million streams and significant sales successes and awards. He also pursued his own independent artistic projects. Driven by the “fundamental questions about reality that constantly accompanied him”, he began in 2014 his transition into the field of neuroscience, psychology and neuroinformatics. Rodriguez completed his academic training at the University of Zurich and ETH Zurich, where he was also involved in cognitive and affective neuroscience research. During this period, he simultaneously acquired his consulting background in the private sector, among others at siroop. In 2020, he eventually came up with the initial idea of C-Pattern Theory, whereupon he wrote first the paper and then the book on the theory. In the same year, he founded Exmosol and developed 360° Customer Excellence.

C-Pattern Theory and Exmosol 
C-Pattern Theory deals in its core with subjective experience, consciousness and the mind-body problem. At issue is the question of how to get from mere brain activity even in principle to something so different as subjective experience and consciousness. The theory's approach and broad implications significantly challenge classical materialism. At the same time, this opens up new possibilities. Accordingly, Exmosol is concerned with exploring the practical application of C-Pattern Theory. The focus lies on self-improvement, neuroenhancement, the clinical sector, and next-generation neuroscience-derived technologies.

360° Customer Excellence 
360° Customer Excellence aims at an effective optimization of the customer interaction through, among other things, a multidimensional assessment, a "true client first" approach, maximum alignment and a standardized framework. The framework consists of 8 areas each for the 6 main areas Journey & Service Design, Customer Insights & Analytics, Operational Excellence & Digital, Customer Service & Success, Marketing Automation & CRM und Customer Engagement & Value.

References

External links 

 Official website

Non-fiction writers
Consciousness researchers and theorists
Swiss businesspeople
Living people
Year of birth missing (living people)